Gygaea was a daughter of Amyntas I and sister of Alexander I of Macedon. She was given away in marriage by her brother to the Persian General Bubares. Herodotus also mentions a son of Bubares and Gygaea, called Amyntas, who was later given the city Alabanda in Caria by Xerxes I (r. 486-465). 

There is also another Gygaea, second wife of Amyntas III of Macedon, whose son Menelaus was put to death by his half-brother Philip II in 347 BC.

References

Sources

Ancient Macedonian princesses
5th-century BC Macedonians
4th-century BC Macedonians
Achaemenid Macedon
Ancient Greek emigrants to the Achaemenid Empire
Women of the Achaemenid Empire
Argead dynasty
5th-century BC Greek women
4th-century BC Greek women